The 2015 Waverley Borough Council election took place on 7 May 2015 to elect members of Waverley Borough Council in England as one of the 2015 local elections, held simultaneously with the General Election.

Results
In 2011 Conservatives won all seats except one won by an independent, but saw in the four years three defections of councillors opposed to the group's intra-borough priorities.

Defections considered, the 2015 result saw the same number of Conservatives returned to the council, with areas of politically-standing residents associations winning three seats compensating, as the bulk of opposition, for the loss of three Independent seats across the borough to Conservatives.  There was only one other party represented, UKIP, in the form of Diane James, MEP, who lost her majority in single-seat Elstead to a Conservative, her winning denomination in the last election.  An independent picked up a seat to balance the majority, Conservative, grouping as the same as immediately before the election.

Ward by ward

References

2015 English local elections
May 2015 events in the United Kingdom
2015
2010s in Surrey